Elena Lukinichna Mrozovskaya or Helène de Mrosovsky (before 1892–1941) was a Russian Empire and Soviet professional photographer of Montenegrin descent.

Life and career
Mrozovskaya's brother, Vladimir Pavlovich Mrozovsky, was a mechanical engineer and painter, and her uncle, became the military governor-general of Moscow from 1915 to 1917. Mrozovskaya herself was originally a teacher and sales clerk. She studied photography at the Russian Technical Society, finishing in 1892, and then continued her studies with Nadar in Paris. Returning to St. Petersburg, she opened a studio there in 1894. In the 1920s, she was living in Serovo, a district of St. Petersburg. She died in 1941 in Repino, another district of St. Petersburg.

Photography
Mrozovskaya's subjects included Nikolai Rimsky-Korsakov, Mathilde Kschessinska, Vera Komissarzhevskaya, and other artists, writers, and actors of the time. Her photos of the interior of the Saint Petersburg Conservatory, taken beginning in 1896, are among the earliest recordings of the conservatory, and in 1897 she was named its official photographer. She won a bronze medal at the General Art and Industrial Exposition of Stockholm (1897) and a silver medal at the Exposition Universelle (1900) in Paris, and participated as well in the Liège International (1905).

Collections and exhibits

One of her photos, a hand-tinted image of Princess Olga Orlova wearing a kokoshnik at the 1903 Ball in the Winter Palace, is in the collection of the Hermitage Museum and was sent to the Hermitage Rooms of Somerset House in London in 2003, as part of a traveling exhibit celebrating St. Petersburg's tricentennial. Another of her tinted photos, "Portrait of girl in Little Russia costume", is in the collection of the Moscow House of Photography, and was exhibited in Amsterdam in early 2013 as part of an exhibit organized by the Russian Ministry of Culture. Many photos by Mrozovskaya are kept in the collection of the St. Petersburg Conservatory, and several more are in the collection of the Russian State Archive of Literature and Art.

References

Year of birth missing
1941 deaths
Photographers from the Russian Empire
Expatriates from the Russian Empire in France
19th-century women photographers
People from the Russian Empire of Montenegrin descent
Date of death missing
Photographers from Saint Petersburg
Soviet photographers
19th-century photographers from the Russian Empire